Digital Tour is a Philippine television show broadcast by Studio 23 which was aired from 1999 to July 22, 2007.

Hosts
 Iya Yotoko
 Manu Sandejas
 Carlo Ledesma
 JC Gonzalez
 Chunchi Soler
 Archie Alemania

See also
List of programs aired by Studio 23
Studio 23

References

Philippine television shows
Studio 23 original programming
1999 Philippine television series debuts
2007 Philippine television series endings
1990s Philippine television series
Filipino-language television shows